In complex dynamics, the bifurcation locus of a parameterized family of one-variable holomorphic functions informally is a locus of those parameterized points for which the dynamical behavior changes drastically under a small perturbation of the parameter. Thus the bifurcation locus can be thought of as an analog of the Julia set in parameter space. Without doubt, the most famous example of a bifurcation locus is the boundary of the Mandelbrot set.

Parameters in the complement of the bifurcation locus are called J-stable.

References 

 Alexandre E. Eremenko and Mikhail Yu. Lyubich, Dynamical properties of some classes of entire functions, Annales de l'Institut Fourier  42  (1992),  no. 4, 989–1020, http://www.numdam.org/item?id=AIF_1992__42_4_989_0.
 Mikhail Yu. Lyubich, Some typical properties of the dynamics of rational mappings (Russian), Uspekhi Mat. Nauk 38 (1983), no. 5(233), 197–198.
 Ricardo Mañé, Paulo Sad and Dennis Sullivan, On the dynamics of rational maps, Ann. Sci. École Norm. Sup. (4)  16  (1983),  no. 2, 193–217, http://www.numdam.org/item?id=ASENS_1983_4_16_2_193_0. 
 Curtis T. McMullen, Complex dynamics and renormalization, Annals of Mathematics Studies, 135, Princeton University Press, Princeton, NJ, 1994. .

See also
Connectedness locus

Complex analysis